Li Qianyuan (born 12 March 1942) is a general (shangjiang) of the People's Liberation Army (PLA). He a member of the Standing Committee of the 11th National People's Congress. He was a member of the 13th and 16th Central Committee of the Chinese Communist Party and an alternate member of the 14th and 15th Central Committee of the Chinese Communist Party.

Biography
Li was born in the town of Yaocun, in Lin County (now Linzhou), Henan, on 12 March 1942. In 1959, he entered Zhengzhou Textile Machinery College (now Zhongyuan University of Technology), and joined the Communist Youth League of China in the same year. He enlisted in the People's Liberation Army (PLA) in July 1961, and joined the Chinese Communist Party (CCP) in May 1963. After graduating from the PLA Military Academy in 1982, he was assigned to chief of staff of a PLA Division. In 1983, he was commissioned as deputy chief of staff of the 1st Group Army, taking part in the Sino-Vietnamese War. As a result of his distinguished service at the war, he was promoted to commander of the 1st Group Army, replacing Fu Quanyou. In July 1990, he became deputy chief of staff of the Guangzhou Military Region, a position he held until December 1994, when he was promoted to chief of staff of the Lanzhou Military Region. In April 1999, he became deputy commander of the Lanzhou Military Region, rising to commander five months later. He retired in June 2007 and Wang Guosheng was promoted to commander in his plac. In March 2008, he was appointed vice chairperson of the National People's Congress Agricultural and Rural Affairs Committee. 

He was promoted to the rank of major general (shaojiang) in September 1988, lieutenant general (zhongjiang) in 1996 and general (shangjiang) in June 2004.

Personal life 
His younger brother Li Guangyuan is a businessman and politician.

Publication

References

1942 births
Living people
People from Linzhou, Henan
Zhongyuan University of Technology alumni
PLA National Defence University alumni
People's Liberation Army generals from Henan
People's Republic of China politicians from Henan
Chinese Communist Party politicians from Henan
Commanders of the Lanzhou Military Region
Members of the Standing Committee of the 11th National People's Congress
Members of the 13th Central Committee of the Chinese Communist Party
Alternate members of the 14th Central Committee of the Chinese Communist Party
Alternate members of the 15th Central Committee of the Chinese Communist Party
Members of the 16th Central Committee of the Chinese Communist Party